Zonke Dikana (born 11 October 1979), known simply as Zonke, is a South African singer-songwriter and record producer. Her rise to stardom came in 2011 following the release of her third album, Ina Ethe, which was certified double platinum and was nominated at the 18th South African Music Awards. In 2013, she recorded and released Give and Take Live, which was certified gold just two months after its release and earned her a place in the Channel O list of "Africa's Top 10 Female Singing Sensations". In September 2015, Zonke released Work of Heart, her fifth album, to critical acclaim with nominations in several categories at the 15th Metro FM Music Awards and 22nd South African Music Awards. She signed a record deal to Sony Music Entertainment in 2013. On 15 June 2018, she released L.O.V.E, her fifth studio album, with Sony.

Early life and education
Zonke was born in KwaZakhele, Eastern Cape, South Africa. Her father, Vuyisile Dikana, was a drummer for a group called Black Slave and the Flamingo while her late stepmother Anneline Malebo was a singer for a musical band known as Joy. She is an alumna of the University of the Free State, from where she graduated with a degree in human resource management in 1997.

Career

1996–2007: early beginnings, Soulitary and Life, Love 'n Music
During Zonke's early years as a singer, Anneline Malebo introduced her to several artists, including Ringo, Joe Nina and Deborah Fraser, who she worked with either in writing or vocal capabilities. Zonke had her big break when she wrote a song titled "Africa, My Motherland" for the band Jazzkantine, based in Germany. The band later became known as Culture Clan after Zonke and the rappers Mandla and Mzo.

In 2003, Culture Clan released an album titled Africa. It was released in Germany, winning awards from the Channel O and Metro FM Music Awards. During her time in Germany, Zonke's first studio album, Soulitary, was released by Upper Street Records with distribution in Germany, Japan and Italy in 2004. In 2007, Kalawa Jazmee Records released her second album, Life, Love 'n Music.

2008–13: Ina Ethe and Give and Take Live
In June 2011, Zonke left Kalawa Jamzee for TMP Records and started to record Ina Ethe, her third studio album. Preceding the album's release were two singles, "Jik'Izinto" and "Feelings". Ina Ethe was self-produced and was released by TMP Records to critical reviews. The album did well commercially, going double platinum.

On 25 October 2013, Zonke recorded a live album at the Lyric Theatre in  Goldreef City, Johannesburg, released by Sony Music Entertainment as Give and Take Live. The album achieved gold status within two months of its release. Give and Take Live also won two category awards at the 20th South African Music Awards.

2014–2017: Work of Heart
Following the death of Zonke's older sister Lulu Dikana, Zonke started working on her fourth studio album, Work of Heart, by releasing the singles "Reach It" and "Meet Me in My Dreams". In an interview with Katlego Mkhwanazi of The Mail & Guardian, Zonke said that the album was inspired by everything that happened to her. The album contains 13 songs and was released on 11 September 2015 by Sony Music Entertainment. Work of Heart was nominated in the Best Female Album and Best African Pop Album categories at the 15th Metro FM Music Awards. It was also nominated in five categories at the 22nd South African Music Awards, winning one. On 14 July 2016, it was certified platinum.

At 2017 South African Afro Music Awards, she was nominated for; Best Afro Female Artist, Best Adult Contemporary, Best Afro Album, Best Afro Producer and won Best Afro-soul Album award.

2018-2019: L.O.V.E 
Her seventh  studio album, L.O.V.E, was released on 15 June 15, 2018. It is a 9-track album featuring Kwesta on a song titled "Soul to Keep". In April 2018, Zonke released the lead single "Tonight", which had platinum sales. The album was certified gold with sales of 25 000 units.

L.O.V.E. was nominated  for Album of the Year, Female Artist of the Year and won Best R&B/Soul Album at the 25th annually ceremony

2020-present: tours, Enigma
Zonke embarked on Zonke: The Evergreen In Concert on February  19 in Cape Town, Grand Arena, GrandWest; the tour included 10 dates that ran through to February  29.

In October 2021, her single "Lady" was released as album's lead single.

On April 22, 2022, she announced that her upcoming album Enigma, has done recording it, scheduled to be release on May 27.

In April 26, she teased an art cover of her second single "Oko", via her Facebook. The song was released on April 29, 2022. It debuted number one in South Africa.

Tours and notable performances
On 5 July 2013, Zonke performed and recorded her live album Give and Take Live at a sold-out concert at the Lyric Theatre in Johannesburg after it was postponed following the death of her sister Busisiwe Dikana. On 20 March 2016, Zonke performed at the Ticketpro Dome in Johannesburg alongside American soul singer Lionel Richie, who was touring South Africa as part of his "All The Hits All Night Long" tour.

Artistry
Zonke Dikana is a versatile singer who sings in English and Xhosa language. During her time as a Kalawa Jazmee Records artist, her genre of music was mostly house music before she switched to afrosoul and neo soul on signing to TMP Entertainment. Her musical influences include Busi Mhlongo, Miriam Makeba and Brenda Fassie.

Discography

Live album

Studio albums

Singles

Television appearance
In July 2014, Zonke was announced as one of three celebrities to act as judges in the first episode of the X Factor SA which was broadcast on SABC 1 between September and December 2014.

Awards and nominations

Zonke's contribution to the South African music industry has earned her several awards and nominations in music award events including the South African Music Awards, Metro FM Music Awards, the Channel O Music Video Awards and MTV Africa Music Awards.

References

External links

1979 births
Living people
South African singer-songwriters
People from the Eastern Cape
University of the Free State alumni
21st-century South African women singers
Xhosa people
South African women record producers